Deluxe Men in Space is a Man or Astro-man? 7-inch EP/CDEP released on Touch & Go Records and One Louder Records in 1996. The 7-inch was released on black vinyl, with a gatefold sleeve.

Track listing
All tracks by Man or Astro-man? except where noted.

Vector Side
 "Maximum Radiation Level" – 1:52
 "U-URANUS" (Becker, Blake, Cacavas, Wolf) – 1:30
 "March of the Androids" – 0:44

Vector Exit Side
 "Super Rocket Rumble" (Black, Bob Garvey) – 2:31
 "Configuration 9" – 2:04
 "Rhombics" – 0:47

Personnel
Star Crunch – Primary guitar sound replications, voice waves
Birdstuff – Mathematical tempo infusions
Coco the Electronic Monkey Wizard – Tertiary low frequency guitar sound replication, all things wireless and good
Dexter X, Man from Planet Q – Secondary guitar sound replication

References

Man or Astro-man? EPs
1996 EPs
Touch and Go Records EPs